Okram Joy Singh is the chief of the Manipur People's Party, a political party based in the Indian state of Manipur.

References

Meitei people
Living people
Year of birth missing (living people)
Place of birth missing (living people)
Manipur politicians
Manipur Peoples Party politicians
Bharatiya Janata Party politicians from Manipur
Indian National Congress politicians